Marybeth may refer to:

Marybeth Davis (born c. 1952), American nurse convicted of the murders of her two children in 1997
Marybeth Dunston, character in Hatchet (film series)
Marybeth Fama, young adult author, best known for her book Monstrous Beauty
Marybeth Gasman, Samuel DeWitt Proctor Endowed Chair in Education & a Distinguished Professor at Rutgers University
Marybeth Linzmeier (born 1963), American former competition swimmer who represented the United States
Marybeth Peil (born 1940), American actress and soprano
Marybeth Peters (born 1939), American attorney, 11th United States Register of Copyrights
Marybeth Redmond, American politician in the Vermont House of Representatives
Marybeth Tinker, American free speech activist
Marybeth Tinning (born 1942), American serial killer